Tall-e Siah-ye Ludab (also romanized as Tall-e Sīāh-ye Lūdāb) is a village in Ludab Rural District, Ludab District, Boyer-Ahmad County, Kohgiluyeh and Boyer-Ahmad province, Iran. At the 2006 census, its population was 137, in 27 families.

References 

Populated places in Boyer-Ahmad County